Josephine Wapakabulo, also Josephine Wapakabulo Thomas, is an electrical engineer and business executive. She served as the founding Chief Executive Officer of Uganda National Oil Company (UNOC). She was appointed in June 2016, being the first person to serve in that position. She resigned as UNOC CEO, with effect from 13 August 2019, "to focus on her family and new opportunities".

Background and education
She was born in 1976, in Arusha, Tanzania. She is the daughter of Angelina Wapakhabulo and the late James Wapakhabulo.  She studied at Loughborough University in the United Kingdom, as an electronic and electrical engineer, obtaining a BEng, an MSc and a PhD at the same university. She also holds an Executive MBA from INSEAD Business School in France.

Career
From 2000 until 2002, Wapakabulo worked as a Leadership Trainee & Community Organizer in Coventry, United Kingdom. From 2002 until 2006, she worked as a research associate at LSC Group Consulting in Lichfield, United Kingdom. In 2006, she joined Rolls-Royce in Derby, United Kingdom, as a Business Process & Information Engineering Specialist, serving in that capacity until 2011. From 2011 until 2014, she served as a Quality Executive and Engineering Chief of Quality and Continuous Improvement at Rolls-Royce in the Berlin Area, in Germany.

Between 2014 and 2015, she served as the Chief Operating Officer at The Walk Free Foundation in Perth, Australia. In 2015, she returned to her native Uganda and worked as a Business Consultant in Kampala, until 2016. She was named CEO by the Board of UNOC, in June 2016.

She took up her appointment at Uganda National Oil Company on 1 August 2016, with over 16 years' experience in effective leadership, team building, project management and innovation in multinational companies, across multiple continents. Today, she is founder and managing director of TIG Africa.

See also
Uganda Oil Refinery
Petroleum Authority of Uganda
Sironko District
Proscovia Nabbanja
Wapakhabulo

References

External links
 Uganda National Oil Company Seeks to Recruit Top Executives
 UNOC appoints Wapakabulo for CEO

1976 births
Living people
Ugandan women engineers
Ugandan electrical engineers
People from Sironko District
Alumni of Loughborough University
INSEAD alumni
Ugandan women business executives
Ugandan business executives
21st-century Ugandan women
21st-century women engineers
Ugandan women chief executives
21st-century Ugandan women scientists
21st-century Ugandan scientists